Henry Augustus Connell was a Canadian businessman and politician who was Mayor of Woodstock, New Brunswick and a member of the Legislative Assembly of New Brunswick.

Early life
Connell was born on October 24, 1834 in Woodstock, New Brunswick to Isabella Harding and Henry Farmer Connell. At the age of 14, Connell left home to work at steam driving in northern Maine. He later moved to Bangor, Maine to train as a machinist. Connell returned to Canada and worked as an engineer on the steamship John Waring. He was unhappy with the drudgery and small pay of his job and decided to leave the county to find employment. Connell would work in Florida, Brazil, Argentina, Uruguay, and China. While in South America, he managed a fleet of 55 steamers.

Business career
In 1870 he returned to Woodstock. He and his brothers, Charles and William, invested in the Vulcan Foundry, which became Connell Bros. Henry was the head and manager of the company. The company manufactured shingle machines, mill machinery, threshers, horse-powered sawing machines, pulpers, stoves, furnaces, steel plows, harrows, cultivators, and other agricultural implements. In 1904, Connell sold the company, which retained the Connell Bros. name.

Connell was also manager of the Tobique Valley Mining and Manufacturing Company.

Politics
Connell served as Mayor of Woodstock from 1885 to 1890. From October 22, 1892 to January 17, 1895 he was a member of the Legislative Assembly of New Brunswick for Carleton County. He was a minister without portfolio in the government of Andrew George Blair from 1892 to 1893.

Connell also served on the Woodstock School Board and was the Woodstock Electric Light Company's superintendent, manager, and purchasing agent.

Personal life and death
Connell married three times. In 1845 he married Harriet Ketchum. She died in 1873. The couple had one child who died in infancy. He married his second wife, Rebecca Barnes, on July 15, 1874 in Saint John, New Brunswick. The marriage resulted in one child, Augusta Gertrude. Barnes died in 1882. His third wife, Ellen MacDonald, died in 1903. They had no children.

Connell died on May 28, 1917.

Notes
1. Carleton County sent two representatives to the Legislative Assembly during Connell's tenure. In 1892 Connell and Allan Dibblee succeeded George R. Ketchum and Marcus C. Atkinson.

References

1834 births
1917 deaths
Businesspeople from New Brunswick
Pre-Confederation Canadian emigrants to the United States
Canadian emigrants to Brazil
Canadian expatriates in Brazil
Canadian expatriates in Argentina
Canadian expatriates in Chile
Canadian expatriates in China
Mayors of Woodstock, New Brunswick
Members of the Legislative Assembly of New Brunswick
Steamship captains